Waddicar is the name given to an area of the Metropolitan Borough of Sefton, Merseyside, between Melling and Kirkby in the Metropolitan Borough of Knowsley.

Transport
Waddicar is served by the 345 bus service operated by Arriva which runs between the town and Liverpool city centre.

There are no railway stations serving Waddicar, the nearest railway station is Kirkby railway station serving the town of Kirkby by frequent electric services from Kirkby railway station to Liverpool Central railway station, and diesel services to Wigan and Manchester.

External links

Towns and villages in the Metropolitan Borough of Sefton